The Bell X-14 (Bell Type 68) is an experimental VTOL aircraft flown in the United States in the 1950s. The main objective of the project was to demonstrate vectored thrust horizontal and vertical takeoff, hover, transition to forward flight, and vertical landing.

Design and development

Bell constructed the X-14 as an open-cockpit, all-metal (duralumin) monoplane for the USAF. It was powered by two Armstrong Siddeley Viper turbojet engines equipped with thrust deflectors sited at the aircraft's centre of gravity. The engines are fixed in position; transition from vertical to horizontal flight is achieved with a system of movable vanes that control the direction of engine thrust. The X-14 was designed using existing parts from two Beechcraft aircraft: wings, ailerons, and landing gear of a Beech Bonanza and the tailcone and empennage of a Beech T-34 Mentor.

Operational history
The X-14 first flew on 19 February 1957 as a vertical takeoff, hover, then vertical landing. The first transition from hover to horizontal flight occurred on 24 May 1958. In 1959, its Viper engines were replaced with General Electric J85 engines. That year the aircraft was delivered to the NASA Ames Research Center as the X-14A. During the development of the P.1127, Hawker test pilots Bill Bedford and Hugh Merewether visited NASA Ames to fly the X-14 and acquaint themselves with jet V/STOL aircraft handling prior to the first flights of the prototype P.1127. It served as a test aircraft with NASA until 1981.

The X-14 project provided a great deal of data on VTOL (Vertical TakeOff and Landing) type aircraft and flight control systems.

In 1971, the X-14A was fitted with new engines (General Electric J85-GE-19) and redesignated the X-14B.  An onboard computer and digital fly-by-wire control system were also installed to enable emulation of landing characteristics of other VTOL aircraft.

The X-14B was used in this test role until it was damaged beyond repair in a landing accident on 29 May 1981. At the time, there were plans to develop an X-14C with an enclosed cockpit. There were also plans for an X-14T trainer. None of these further versions got beyond the planning stage.

During all of its years of service, the X-14 was flown by over 25 pilots with no serious incidents or injuries.

Aircraft serial numbers
Although there was only one airframe, it changed serial numbers with every major upgrade.
X-14 - USAF 56-4022
X-14A - NASA 234 (N234NA).
X-14B - NASA 704 (N704NA).

Surviving aircraft

The X-14B was rescued from the scrap yard in 1991 and is undergoing renovation as part of the Ropkey Armor and Aviation Museum.

Specifications (X-14B)

See also

References

Further reading

 
 

X-014
X-14, Bell
V/STOL aircraft by thrust vectoring
Twinjets
NASA aircraft
Mid-wing aircraft
Aircraft first flown in 1957